46th Street station is a light rail station on the Metro Blue Line in Minneapolis, Minnesota. This station is located on the northwest corner of the intersection of 46th Street and Minnesota State Highway 55 (Hiawatha Avenue), in the Ericsson neighborhood. This is a side-platform station. Service began at this station when the Blue Line opened on June 26, 2004.

46th Street Station is one of the main bus interchanges on the Blue Line in Minneapolis. Buses serving south Minneapolis and St. Paul serve the station's bus interchange. A bus rapid transit line, called the A Line, began operating on Snelling Avenue in June 2016, beginning its route at 46th Street Station; the line also connects to the Green Line at Snelling Avenue and University Avenue.

Services
From 46th Street Station there are direct bus connections to the A Line and routes 7, 9, 46 and 74, and Minnesota Valley Transit Authority routes 436 and 446. HourCar, a local carsharing program, has a solar-powered charging station at 46th Street for the organization's fleet of plug-in Toyota Priuses. The Hiawatha LRT Trail, which runs along much of the METRO Blue Line route, provides connection for bicyclists to reach East Minnehaha Parkway and Minnehaha Park.

References

External links 

Metro Transit: 46th Street Station

Metro Blue Line (Minnesota) stations in Minneapolis
Railway stations in the United States opened in 2004
2004 establishments in Minnesota